"Trippin' on a Hole in a Paper Heart" is a song by American rock band Stone Temple Pilots, featured on their third album, Tiny Music... Songs from the Vatican Gift Shop. An alternative rock tune, it was recorded in 1995 and released as a single the following year. The track is also on the greatest hits album, Thank You.

Track listing
"Trippin' on a Hole in a Paper Heart"
"Pop's Love Suicide"
"Ride the Cliché"

Composition and meaning
The core music was written by drummer Eric Kretz, while the lyrics were written by Scott Weiland. Weiland stated in a radio interview that the very ambiguous and mysterious lyrics to the song alluded to a "very bad experience dropping acid." In his autobiography Not Dead and Not For Sale (its title a reference to the lyrics of Trippin'''), he adds that it "reflects my hunger for redemption"

Critical reception
Marty Sartini Garner of Pitchfork praised "Trippin' on a Hole in a Paper Heart" as a representation of alternative rock "whose burning chorus would've fit on Alice in Chains' Dirt, and whose choppy, pepped-up verses cleared a happier path out of grunge that bands like Third Eye Blind would gladly follow."

In 2015, Loudwire and Stereogum ranked the song number six and number one, respectively, on their lists of the 10 greatest Stone Temple Pilots songs.

Charts

Awards and accolades
The band has had seven songs reach the number one position on the Billboard Hot Mainstream Rock Tracks chart, with "Trippin' on a Hole in a Paper Heart" being their fifth single to reach the top. In 1997, the song received a nomination for Best Hard Rock Performance at the Grammy Awards.

Appearances of the song
Cover version is featured in Guitar Hero II and Guitar Hero Mobile. 
Master track is featured in Guitar Hero: Smash Hits and downloadable content for Rock Band'' series.
Since their 2008 reunion it has frequently been the band's closing song in concerts.

References 

1996 singles
Songs about drugs
Songs based on actual events
Stone Temple Pilots songs
Songs written by Eric Kretz
Songs written by Scott Weiland
Song recordings produced by Brendan O'Brien (record producer)
1996 songs